The 31st century BC was a century that lasted from the year 3100 BC to 3001 BC.

Events

c. 3100 BC: Polo was first played in Manipur state.
c. 3100 BC?: The Anu Ziggurat and White Temple are built in Uruk.
c. 3100 BC?: Predynastic period (Neolithic) ends in Ancient Egypt.
c. 3100 BC?: Early Dynastic (Archaic) period starts in Ancient Egypt.
c. 3100 BC?: The first temple of Tarxien is in use by the Neolithic inhabitants of Malta.
c. 3100 BC?: First stage in the construction of Stonehenge.
c. 3100 BC – 2600 BC: Skara Brae, Orkney Islands, Scotland is inhabited. 
c. 3090 BC: Narmer (Menes) unifies Upper and Lower Egypt into one country; he rules this new country from Memphis.
c. 3051 BC: The oldest currently living organism, a Great Basin bristlecone pine, undergoes germination in the White Mountains of California.

Inventions, discoveries, introductions
 Drainage and sewage system in the Indus Valley
 Dams, canals, stone sculptures using inclined plane and lever in Sumer and the Tigris-Euphrates Valley
 Copper was in use, both as tools and weapons
 Senet is one of the oldest known board games in the world. 
 c. 3100 BC – Invention of writing in Mesopotamia and Egypt
The Sydney rock engravings date to around 3000 BC (Sydney, Australia).

Notes

References

 
-9
-69